Sarbjit Singh Cheema (Punjabi: ਸਰਭਜੀਤ ਸਿੰਘ ਚੀਮਾ) is an Indian-Canadian actor and singer who sings in the Punjabi language.

Early life
Sarbjit Singh Cheema was born in the Jalandhar district of Punjab, India into a Punjabi Jatt-Sikh family of Cheema clan. He moved to Canada in 1989.

Career 
Cheema's most successful album was "Chandigarh Shaher Di Kuddi". He has performed in the rock genre with Boliyan and Gidha Beats. His smash hit Punjabi song Rangla Punjab, from his album Mela Vekhdiye Mutiyare, was released in 1996. His hits are Billo teri tor vekh ke, Dhol Vajda, Rang rara riri rara, Bhangra, Nacho-Nacho, Khatta Doria, Chandigarh Shehar di kudi, Boliyan. Many times his albums' music was produced by musician Sukhpal Sukh and Atul Sharma. Now he is working with musician Aman Hayer. He has sung many Boliyan in his albums. Cheema Has 2 Religious albums. He has 12 studio albums. His New Album "Indian Sardari" Is Due To Release in October 2016, Music Composed By Tigerstyle, Rupin Kahlon & Tru-Skool And On MovieBox (UK) & T-Series (India).

Discography

Single songs

Film career 
He started his Film career by appearing in the lead role in film Pind Di Kudi in 2004, with Sheeba Bhakri and Veena Malik. He then appeared in Apni Boli Apna Des in 2009. He worked in film Punjab Bolda in 2013, starring with Anisha Pooja, Gurchet Chitrakar, B.N Sharma, Binnu Dhillon, Karamjit Anmol, Amarjit Cheema. He also worked in Punjabi film named Haani with Harbhajan Mann, which was released in 2013. He also worked in a film named Ashke in 2018, starring with Amrinder Gill.

Filmography

References

External links 
 Official website

Punjabi people
Indian Sikhs
Indian emigrants to Canada
Canadian people of Indian descent
Canadian people of Punjabi descent
Canadian Sikhs
Punjabi-language singers
Male actors in Punjabi cinema
Living people
21st-century Indian male actors
Male actors from Punjab, India
Indian male voice actors
Punjabi music
Bhangra (music) musicians
Year of birth missing (living people)